Euparatettix is an Asian genus of ground-hoppers (Orthoptera: Caelifera) in the subfamily Tetriginae and tribe Tetrigini.

Species 
The Catalogue of Life lists:
Euparatettix albomaculatus Zheng & Xu, 2010
Euparatettix albonemus Zheng & Deng, 2004
Euparatettix albostriatus Zheng & Deng, 2004
Euparatettix annulicornis Deng & Zheng, 2006
Euparatettix apterus Zheng & Ou, 2009
Euparatettix avellanitibis Zheng & Jiang, 2006
Euparatettix balteatus Walker, 1871
Euparatettix barbifemura Zheng & Ou, 2003
Euparatettix barbifemuraoides Deng, Zheng & Qin, 2008
Euparatettix bengalensis Hancock, 1912
Euparatettix bimaculatus Zheng, 1993
Euparatettix birmanicus Hancock, 1915
Euparatettix brachynotus Zheng & Jiang, 1996
Euparatettix brachyptera Zheng & Mao, 2002
Euparatettix candidistris Zheng & Jiang, 2006
Euparatettix circinihumerus Wei & Zheng, 2006
Euparatettix cultratus Bolívar, 1898
Euparatettix erythronotus Zheng & Jiang, 2000
Euparatettix euguangxiensis Zheng & Wei, 2005
Euparatettix fangchengensis Zheng, 2005
Euparatettix galbustriatus Zheng & Li, 2012
Euparatettix globivertex Zheng, Shi & Mao, 2010
Euparatettix gongshanensis Zheng, 1992
Euparatettix guangxiensis Zheng, 1994
Euparatettix guinanensis Wei & Zheng, 2006
Euparatettix histricus Stål, 1861
Euparatettix indicus Bolívar, 1887
Euparatettix insularis Bey-Bienko, 1951
Euparatettix jingdongensis Zheng & Ou, 2003
Euparatettix jinghongensis Zheng, Zeng & Ou, 2011
Euparatettix leuconotus Zheng, Lu & Li, 2000
Euparatettix lijiangensis Zheng & Ou, 2010
Euparatettix liubaensis Zheng, 2005
Euparatettix lochengensis Zheng, 2005
Euparatettix longipennis Zheng & Jiang, 2000
Euparatettix macrocephalus Günther, 1941
Euparatettix melanotus Zheng & Jiang, 1997
Euparatettix menglianensis Zheng & Xu, 2010
Euparatettix menglunensis Zheng, 2006
Euparatettix menlunensis Zheng, 2006
Euparatettix mimus Bolívar, 1887
Euparatettix nigrifasciatus Zheng & Ou, 2010
Euparatettix nigrifemurus Deng, Zheng & Wei, 2007
Euparatettix nigritibis Zheng & Jiang, 2000
Euparatettix obliquecosta Zheng & Jiang, 2006
Euparatettix ochronemus Zheng, Shi & Mao, 2010
Euparatettix parvus Hancock, 1904
Euparatettix personatus (Bolívar, 1887) - type species (as Paratettix personatus Bolívar)
Euparatettix planipedonoides Zheng & Jiang, 2003
Euparatettix planipedonus Zheng, 1998
Euparatettix prominemarginis Zheng, 2005
Euparatettix pseudomelanotus Zheng & Jiang, 2004
Euparatettix rapidus Steinmann, 1964
Euparatettix rongshuiensis Zheng, 2005
Euparatettix scabripes Bolívar, 1898
Euparatettix semihirsutus Brunner von Wattenwyl, 1893
Euparatettix serrifemoralis Zheng & Xie, 2007
Euparatettix sikkimensis Hancock, 1915
Euparatettix similis Hancock, 1907
Euparatettix sinufemoralis Zheng & Jiang, 2002
Euparatettix spicuvertex Zheng, 1998
Euparatettix spicuvertexoides Zheng, 2005
Euparatettix strimaculatus Zheng, Lu & Li, 2000
Euparatettix torulosinotus Zheng, 1998
Euparatettix tricarinatus Bolívar, 1887
Euparatettix tridentatus Zheng, 2005
Euparatettix variabilis Bolívar, 1887
Euparatettix waterstoni Uvarov, 1952
Euparatettix xinchengensis Zheng, Shi & Luo, 2003
Euparatettix xizangensis Zheng, 2005
Euparatettix yunnanensis Zheng & Xie, 2000
Euparatettix zayuensis Zheng, Zeng & Ou, 2011

References

External links 
 

Tetrigidae
Caelifera genera
Orthoptera of Asia